Full Moon on the Farm is an album of American guitarist Norman Blake and the Rising Fawn String Ensemble, released in 1981.

Track listing
 "Kennedy Rag"
 "Nancy's Hornpipe"
 "Texola Waltz" (Nancy Blake)
 "Gilderoy"
 "Davenport March"
 "OBC #3"
 "Cairo Waltz" (Norman Blake)
 "Jacky Tar"
 "Sleepy-Eyed Joe"
 "The Dog Star"
 "Salty"
 "Diamonds in the Rough"

References

1981 albums
Norman Blake (American musician) albums